Stephen Anthony Urban (born 1952 in Wilkes-Barre, Pennsylvania) is a former Luzerne County Commissioner and member of the Luzerne County Council.

2010 Lieutenant Governor Campaign
Urban was a Republican candidate in the 2010 Primary Election for Lieutenant Governor of Pennsylvania. He was also the unopposed Republican candidate for the Pennsylvania Senate - District 14 Primary Election on May 18, 2010. Stephen Urban ran against John Yudichak and lost in the November 2, 2010 General Election.

Transition to County Council
With the decision to adopt a home rule charter in 2011, Commissioner Urban decided to run for one of the seats on the new 11 person county council. He placed second in the 2011 General Election with 22,741 votes.

References

1952 births
Living people
Pennsylvania Republicans
Politicians from Wilkes-Barre, Pennsylvania
Recipients of the Legion of Merit
Luzerne County Councilmembers (Pennsylvania)